The Nepal Government Railway (NGR) was Nepal's first railway in Nepal. Established in 1927 and closed in 1965, it linked Amlekhganj with Raxaul across the border in India in the south. The  narrow gauge railway was 47 km long.

History

In 1923, a short narrow gauge railway was built by J. V. Collier of the Indian Forest Service to transport Nepalese timber to India. Collier had been assigned by Nepal's Rana prime minister to manage the forest department in Nepal. In the winter of 1924, Martin and Co. of Kolkata conducted a survey to construct a light railway from the border north to Bichako (Amlekhganj).

Construction began in March 1926, and the Nepal Government Railway opened on 16 February 1927. The railway possessed seven steam locomotives, 12 coaches and 82 wagons. It operated steam-powered Garratt locomotives manufactured by Beyer, Peacock & Company of England.

Until the highway was built, the Amlekhganj-Raxaul railway was the only route indirectly connecting the capital Kathmandu with India. From Kathmandu, travellers journeyed over the hills on foot, and then by lorry to Amlekhganj where they took the train to India. The need to walk was eliminated after Tribhuvan Highway linking Kathmandu with Amlekhganj was built in 1956. The first daily bus service began operating on it in 1959, conducted by a private company named Nepal Transport Service.

Closure
The Nepal Government Railway remained in service till 1965 when the construction of the highway linking the southern border made it redundant. The railway was closed down 1965 subsequently.

In popular culture

The Nepal Government Railway appears in the opening scenes of the first Nepali film Aama ("Mother") made by the government of Nepal and released in 1964. It shows the hero, a Gurkha soldier returning to Nepal on leave, travelling on the train as he heads for home.

Gallery

See also

 Nepal Railways

References

2 ft 6 in gauge railways in Nepal
Defunct railway companies
Defunct transport companies of Nepal
Railway companies established in 1927
Railway companies disestablished in 1965
1927 establishments in Nepal
1965 disestablishments in Nepal